opened in Akkeshi, Hokkaidō, Japan in 1991 to commemorate the centenary of the settlement of Tondenhei "pioneers" in Ōta.

See also
 Hokkaido Museum
 Hokkaidō Development Commission
 Akkeshi Maritime Affairs Memorial Museum

References

External links
  Akkeshi Town Ōta Tonden Kaitaku Memorial Museum

Akkeshi, Hokkaido
Museums in Hokkaido
Museums established in 1991
1991 establishments in Japan